Abdessamad Qaiouh (also Abdessamed Kayouh,  - born 11 April 1966, Oulad Teima) is a Moroccan politician of the Istiqlal Party. He was Minister of Handicrafts in  the cabinet of Abdelilah Benkirane.

In April 2013, while King Mohammed VI was on vacation in France, Hamid Chabat Secretary-General of the Istiqlal Party announced his intentions to leave the coalition that forms the cabinet of Abdelilah Benkirane. Consequently, a resignation request was submitted on 9 July 2013 for all the Party's ministers.

References

External links
Ministry of Crafts

Living people
Government ministers of Morocco
1966 births
People from Oulad Teima
Istiqlal Party politicians